Stella is a surname meaning star in Latin and Italian. Notable persons with the surname include:

Artists

Fermo Stella (1490s–1560s), Italian painter
François Stella (1563–1605), French Baroque painter
Frank Stella (born 1936), American painter, sculptor and printmaker
Giacomo Stella (fl. 1572–1644), Italian Renaissance painter
Guglielmo Stella (1828–1888), Italian Realist painter and writer
Guido Balsamo Stella (1882–1941) Italian painter and engraver
Jacques Stella (1596–1657), French painter
Joseph Stella (1877–1946), American painter

Athletes

Aldo Stella (footballer) (born 1930), Italian goalkeeper
Aldo Stella (skier) (born 1943), Italian ski mountaineer and skier
Francesco Stella (footballer), (born 1991) is an Australian footballer
Gianfranco Stella (born 1938), Italian ski mountaineer and skier
Harry Stella (1916–1997), American football player and United States Army officer
Noemi Stella (born 1997), Italian race walker
Tommy La Stella (born 1989), American baseball player

Musicians and composers

Andrea Stella (fl. 1620s), an Italian priest and composer
Antonietta Stella (1929–2022), Italian soprano
Carlos Stella (born 1961), Argentine composer
Lennon Stella (born 1999), Canadian singer and actress
Maisy Stella (born 2003), from Canadian country music duo The Stellas
Scipione Stella (died 1622), Neapolitan composer
Simone Stella (born 1981), Italian harpsichordist and organist

Religion

Aldo Maria Lazzarín Stella (1926–2010), bishop of the Roman Catholic Apostolic Vicariate of Aisén, Chile
Beniamino Stella (born 1941), Italian cardinal
Marcello Stella (died 1642), Roman Catholic Bishop of Isernia
Tommaso Stella (died 1566), Roman Catholic Bishop of Capodistria, Lavello, and Salpi

Other people

Aldo Stella (disambiguation), several people with the name
Andrea Stella (engineer), an engineer currently working in Formula One
Francesco Stella (1862–1940), Italian set designer, artist-painter, and decorator
Franco Stella (disambiguation), several people with the name
Javier Arias Stella (1924–2020), Peruvian pathologist who discovered the eponymous "Arias-Stella reaction"
Lucius Arruntius Stella (fl. c. 100AD), Roman senator
Maria Stella (1773–1843), self-styled legitimate daughter of Louis Philip II, Duke of Orleans
Martina Stella (born 1984), Italian actress
Rebecca Stella (born 1985), Swedish singer, designer, model and blogger
Roberto Stella (–2020), Italian general practitioner 
Sebastien Stella (born 1971), French choreographer and director

See also
Stella (disambiguation)
Stella (given name), including a list of people bearing the name

Italian-language surnames